Pseudoclanis somaliae is a moth of the  family Sphingidae. It is known from Somalia.

References

Pseudoclanis
Moths described in 2007